Samuel Ricardo Seale (born October 6, 1962) is a Barbadian-born former American football cornerback who played ten seasons in the National Football League, mainly for the Los Angeles Raiders.  He is currently a scout for the Green Bay Packers.

References

1962 births
Living people
Barbadian players of American football
American football cornerbacks
Los Angeles Raiders players
Los Angeles Rams players
Orange High School (New Jersey) alumni
Players of American football from New Jersey
San Diego Chargers players
Sportspeople from Essex County, New Jersey
Western Colorado Mountaineers football players